Christopher S. Cason is an American voice actor for English-language productions of Japanese anime shows mostly with Funimation. Some of his major roles include Babbit in Kodocha, Haruki Hanai in School Rumble, Gluttony in Fullmetal Alchemist, and Shu in Dragon Ball.  He has also worked as an ADR director and script writer for various studios.

Filmography

Anime
 AM Driver - Kukk "KK" Karan
 Aria the Scarlet Ammo - Ryo Shiranui
 Arifureta: From Commonplace to World's Strongest Season 2 - Mikhail
 Baldr Force EXE Resolution - Genha
 Basilisk - Kazamachi Shogen
 BECK: Mongolian Chop Squad - Akage
 Beet the Vandel Buster - General Grineed
 Big Windup! - Kazutoshi Oki
 Birdy the Mighty: Decode - Masakubo
 Black Blood Brothers - Rinsuke Akai
 Case Closed - Bank Clerk, Shunen, Chiba, Emori
 Chrome Shelled Regios - Dixerio Maskane
 Corpse Princess - Rinsen Shirae
 D.Gray-man - No. 65
 Darker than Black - Yasuaki Ou
 Desert Punk - Wano
 Deadman Wonderland - Kōmoto
 The Devil Is a Part-Timer! - Tamura
 Dragon Ball series - Mr. Popo (DBZ Season 3, DBZ Kai, DBS), Tien (DBZ Season 3, original release), Shu, Rage Shenron, Super Kamikaze Ghosts, The Turtle (DBZ Season 3, DBZ Kai), Pintar, Gamisalas, Mule, Malaka (Remastered), Orlen (DBZ)  (Funimation dub)
 Dragon Ball Super: Broly - Shu
 Dragon Ball Z: Battle of Gods - Shu
 Dragon Ball Z: Resurrection 'F' - Shu
 Fairy Tail - Karacka, Wally Buchanan, Richard Buchanan / Hoteye, Fortune Teller (Ep. 4)
 Fullmetal Alchemist - Gluttony
 Fullmetal Alchemist: Brotherhood - Gluttony
 Future Diary - Ryuji Kurosaki (Eps. 20-21, 24, 26)
 Glass Fleet - Gary
 Haganai - Kyou (Ep. 1)
 Hell Girl - Yoshiki Fukasawa
 Hetalia: Axis Powers - Holy Roman Empire
 Initial D - Hiroshi Fumihiro (Funimation dub)
 Is This a Zombie? of the Dead - Male Student (Ep. 1)
 Jormungand: Perfect Order - Hopkins (Ep. 9)
 Kamisama Kiss - Young Man (Ep. 1), Student (Ep. 2), Yokai (Ep. 6)
 Kaze no Stigma - Kousuke Utsumi
 Kenichi: The Mightiest Disciple - Tochumaru, Siegfried
 Kodocha - Babbit
 Level E - Tanaka
 Michiko and Hatchin - Nuno (Clown, Eps. 9, 11)
 My Bride Is a Mermaid - Octopus Nakajima
 Nabari no Ou - Kagero
 Negima! - Albert Chamomile
 One Piece  - Leo, Popo, Rice Rice, Satori, Fuza, Chirp Chirp, Tararan, Pappagu (Funimation dub)
 Ouran High School Host Club - Chikage Ukyo
 Psycho-Pass - Yuji Kanehara (Eps. 3, 6)
 PuraOre! Pride of Orange - Shunzo Nishigori
 The Sacred Blacksmith - Reginald Drummond
 Sailor Moon - Ship Crew (Ep. 12), Additional Voices (Viz dub)
 Save Me! Lollipop - Air Fish (Ep. 2), Dragon (Ep. 6), Imai, Kitty (Ep. 1), Owl (Eps. 1-2, 7, 12), Step Cat (Ep. 12), Stuffed Bear (Ep. 11)
 Scarlet Nexus - Fubuki Spring
 School Rumble - Haruki Hanai
 Sengoku Basara II - Takenaka Hanbei
 The Seven Deadly Sins - Marmas, Narrator
 Sgt. Frog - Taruru
 Crayon Shin-chan (Funimation dub) - Boo, Whitey
 Soul Eater - Jack the Ripper
 Space Dandy - Register (Ep. 13)
 Speed Grapher - Misaski
 Sword Art Online II - Tecchi
 The Tower of Druaga: The Aegis of Uruk - Druaga
 Toriko - Bei
 Tsubasa: Reservoir Chronicle - Kerebos, Yuto Kigai
 YuYu Hakusho - Miyamoto, M1

Video games
 Borderlands 2 - Mal, Face McShooty, Winters, Yanier
 Borderlands: The Pre-Sequel! - Doctor Autohn, King Scumstain, Wolf
 Case Closed: The Mirapolis Investigation - Al Watson
 Detective Pikachu - Additional voices
 Dragon Ball series - Shu, Orlen, Mr. Popo, Turtle
 Fire Emblem Echoes: Shadows of Valentia - Forsyth
 Fullmetal Alchemist 2: Curse of the Crimson Elixir - Gluttony
 Scarlet Nexus - Fubuki Spring
 Shenmue III - Additional Cast
 Street Fighter X Tekken - Mega Man
 The Walking Dead: Survival Instinct - Deputy Jimmy Blake, Flight Command, Sniper 2
 Xenoblade Chronicles X - Tatsu
Re:Zero − Starting Life in Another World: The Prophecy of the Throne - Russell Fellow

Live-action
 Chuck E. Cheese in the Galaxy 5000 - Mr. Munch (in-suit performer), Reporter

Crew

ADR voice director
 The Asterisk War
 Baki the Grappler
 Baldr Force EXE Resolution
 Bamboo Blade
 Birdy the Mighty: Decode
 Case Closed
 Chrome Shelled Regios
 Dragon Ball series
 The Galaxy Railways
 Kaze no Stigma
 Kodocha
 Mobile Suit Gundam: Iron-Blooded Orphans
 Mob Psycho 100
 Negima!?
 Save Me! Lollipop
 Occultic;Nine
 One-Punch Man
 Re:Zero − Starting Life in Another World
 Mamotte! Lollipop
 School Rumble
 The Seven Deadly Sins
 Tsubasa Tokyo Revelations
 YuYu Hakusho
 Yuki Yuna is a Hero

Script writer
 AM Driver
 Black Cat
 Case Closed
 Magi: The Labyrinth of Magic
 One Piece
 Suzuka
 Witchblade
 Yuki Yuna is a Hero

References

External links

Living people
Place of birth missing (living people)
Year of birth missing (living people)
American male video game actors
American male voice actors
Male actors from Fort Worth, Texas
American voice directors
American television writers
American male screenwriters
American male television writers
Screenwriters from Texas
20th-century American male actors
21st-century American male actors